Daniele Bernardes Milan Da Silva (born 6 August 1984) is a former Brazilian Paralympic judoka who competed in international level events.

References

1984 births
Living people
People from São Bernardo do Campo
Paralympic judoka of Brazil
Judoka at the 2004 Summer Paralympics
Judoka at the 2008 Summer Paralympics
Judoka at the 2012 Summer Paralympics
Medalists at the 2004 Summer Paralympics
Medalists at the 2008 Summer Paralympics
Medalists at the 2012 Summer Paralympics
Paralympic medalists in judo
Paralympic bronze medalists for Brazil
Medalists at the 2007 Parapan American Games
Medalists at the 2011 Parapan American Games
Sportspeople from São Paulo (state)
20th-century Brazilian people
21st-century Brazilian people